Kotha Palem is a model village situated one kilometer from Tallur in Prakasam district, in the state of Andhra Pradesh, India.

References 

Kotha palem Saibaba temple website https://web.archive.org/web/20130406134113/http://www.kothapalemsaitemple.com/

Villages in Prakasam district